Bowling Green is an unincorporated community in York County, South Carolina, United States, along U.S. Route 321,  north-northeast of Clover. It has a post office with ZIP code 29703.

References

Unincorporated communities in York County, South Carolina
Unincorporated communities in South Carolina